The 1947–48 New York Rangers season was the franchise's 22nd season. During the regular season, the Rangers had a 21–26–13 record and made the playoffs. In the league semi-finals, the Rangers lost to the Detroit Red Wings in six games.

Regular season

Final standings

Record vs. opponents

Schedule and results

|- align="center" bgcolor="#CCFFCC"
| 1 || 16 || @ Montreal Canadiens || 2–1 || 1–0–0
|- align="center" bgcolor="#FFBBBB"
| 2 || 19 || @ Boston Bruins || 3–1 || 1–1–0
|- align="center" bgcolor="#FFBBBB"
| 3 || 22 || @ Toronto Maple Leafs || 3–1 || 1–2–0
|- align="center" bgcolor="#FFBBBB"
| 4 || 29 || Boston Bruins || 3–1 || 1–3–0
|-

|- align="center" bgcolor="#CCFFCC"
| 5 || 1 || Detroit Red Wings || 4–3 || 2–3–0
|- align="center" bgcolor="#CCFFCC"
| 6 || 2 || Toronto Maple Leafs || 7–4 || 3–3–0
|- align="center" bgcolor="#FFBBBB"
| 7 || 6 || @ Detroit Red Wings || 2–1 || 3–4–0
|- align="center" bgcolor="#FFBBBB"
| 8 || 8 || @ Toronto Maple Leafs || 7–2 || 3–5–0
|- align="center" bgcolor="#FFBBBB"
| 9 || 9 || @ Chicago Black Hawks || 8–5 || 3–6–0
|- align="center" bgcolor="#FFBBBB"
| 10 || 12 || Boston Bruins || 8–2 || 3–7–0
|- align="center" bgcolor="#FFBBBB"
| 11 || 15 || Chicago Black Hawks || 5–3 || 3–8–0
|- align="center" bgcolor="#CCFFCC"
| 12 || 16 || Montreal Canadiens || 4–2 || 4–8–0
|- align="center" bgcolor="#CCFFCC"
| 13 || 19 || @ Detroit Red Wings || 6–5 || 5–8–0
|- align="center" bgcolor="#CCFFCC"
| 14 || 22 || @ Montreal Canadiens || 5–3 || 6–8–0
|- align="center" bgcolor="#CCFFCC"
| 15 || 30 || @ Chicago Black Hawks || 6–2 || 7–8–0
|-

|- align="center" bgcolor="#FFBBBB"
| 16 || 3 || Toronto Maple Leafs || 4–1 || 7–9–0
|- align="center" bgcolor="white"
| 17 || 6 || @ Boston Bruins || 5–5 || 7–9–1
|- align="center" bgcolor="#CCFFCC"
| 18 || 7 || Detroit Red Wings || 3–1 || 8–9–1
|- align="center" bgcolor="white"
| 19 || 10 || Montreal Canadiens || 4–4 || 8–9–2
|- align="center" bgcolor="#CCFFCC"
| 20 || 11 || @ Montreal Canadiens || 4–2 || 9–9–2
|- align="center" bgcolor="#CCFFCC"
| 21 || 13 || @ Toronto Maple Leafs || 4–1 || 10–9–2
|- align="center" bgcolor="white"
| 22 || 14 || Detroit Red Wings || 1–1 || 10–9–3
|- align="center" bgcolor="#CCFFCC"
| 23 || 17 || Boston Bruins || 5–2 || 11–9–3
|- align="center" bgcolor="#FFBBBB"
| 24 || 21 || Montreal Canadiens || 4–3 || 11–10–3
|- align="center" bgcolor="#FFBBBB"
| 25 || 23 || @ Chicago Black Hawks || 7–1 || 11–11–3
|- align="center" bgcolor="#CCFFCC"
| 26 || 25 || @ Detroit Red Wings || 2–0 || 12–11–3
|- align="center" bgcolor="white"
| 27 || 28 || Toronto Maple Leafs || 1–1 || 12–11–4
|- align="center" bgcolor="#CCFFCC"
| 28 || 31 || Boston Bruins || 7–3 || 13–11–4
|-

|- align="center" bgcolor="#FFBBBB"
| 29 || 1 || @ Boston Bruins || 4–1 || 13–12–4
|- align="center" bgcolor="white"
| 30 || 3 || @ Toronto Maple Leafs || 5–5 || 13–12–5
|- align="center" bgcolor="#FFBBBB"
| 31 || 4 || Chicago Black Hawks || 4–1 || 13–13–5
|- align="center" bgcolor="#FFBBBB"
| 32 || 7 || @ Detroit Red Wings || 6–0 || 13–14–5
|- align="center" bgcolor="white"
| 33 || 10 || @ Montreal Canadiens || 1–1 || 13–14–6
|- align="center" bgcolor="#CCFFCC"
| 34 || 11 || Montreal Canadiens || 3–1 || 14–14–6
|- align="center" bgcolor="#CCFFCC"
| 35 || 14 || Chicago Black Hawks || 4–2 || 15–14–6
|- align="center" bgcolor="white"
| 36 || 18 || Toronto Maple Leafs || 2–2 || 15–14–7
|- align="center" bgcolor="#FFBBBB"
| 37 || 21 || Detroit Red Wings || 4–3 || 15–15–7
|- align="center" bgcolor="#FFBBBB"
| 38 || 25 || @ Boston Bruins || 6–4 || 15–16–7
|- align="center" bgcolor="#CCFFCC"
| 39 || 28 || @ Chicago Black Hawks || 3–2 || 16–16–7
|- align="center" bgcolor="#CCFFCC"
| 40 || 31 || @ Montreal Canadiens || 4–2 || 17–16–7
|-

|- align="center" bgcolor="white"
| 41 || 1 || Chicago Black Hawks || 2–2 || 17–16–8
|- align="center" bgcolor="white"
| 42 || 4 || @ Detroit Red Wings || 4–4 || 17–16–9
|- align="center" bgcolor="#FFBBBB"
| 43 || 7 || @ Toronto Maple Leafs || 3–0 || 17–17–9
|- align="center" bgcolor="white"
| 44 || 8 || @ Chicago Black Hawks || 2–2 || 17–17–10
|- align="center" bgcolor="white"
| 45 || 14 || @ Boston Bruins || 4–4 || 17–17–11
|- align="center" bgcolor="white"
| 46 || 15 || Toronto Maple Leafs || 4–4 || 17–17–12
|- align="center" bgcolor="#FFBBBB"
| 47 || 18 || Detroit Red Wings || 3–1 || 17–18–12
|- align="center" bgcolor="#CCFFCC"
| 48 || 22 || Boston Bruins || 4–1 || 18–18–12
|- align="center" bgcolor="#FFBBBB"
| 49 || 25 || Chicago Black Hawks || 7–4 || 18–19–12
|- align="center" bgcolor="#CCFFCC"
| 50 || 29 || Montreal Canadiens || 5–3 || 19–19–12
|-

|- align="center" bgcolor="#CCFFCC"
| 51 || 2 || Toronto Maple Leafs || 1–0 || 20–19–12
|- align="center" bgcolor="#FFBBBB"
| 52 || 3 || @ Detroit Red Wings || 4–2 || 20–20–12
|- align="center" bgcolor="#FFBBBB"
| 53 || 6 || @ Toronto Maple Leafs || 2–1 || 20–21–12
|- align="center" bgcolor="white"
| 54 || 7 || Detroit Red Wings || 2–2 || 20–21–13
|- align="center" bgcolor="#FFBBBB"
| 55 || 10 || @ Boston Bruins || 6–3 || 20–22–13
|- align="center" bgcolor="#FFBBBB"
| 56 || 13 || @ Montreal Canadiens || 3–2 || 20–23–13
|- align="center" bgcolor="#FFBBBB"
| 57 || 14 || Montreal Canadiens || 6–3 || 20–24–13
|- align="center" bgcolor="#FFBBBB"
| 58 || 16 || Boston Bruins || 6–2 || 20–25–13
|- align="center" bgcolor="#CCFFCC"
| 59 || 17 || @ Chicago Black Hawks || 5–2 || 21–25–13
|- align="center" bgcolor="#FFBBBB"
| 60 || 21 || Chicago Black Hawks || 4–3 || 21–26–13
|-

Playoffs

Key:  Win  Loss

Player statistics
Skaters

Goaltenders

†Denotes player spent time with another team before joining Rangers. Stats reflect time with Rangers only.
‡Traded mid-season. Stats reflect time with Rangers only.

Awards and records

Transactions

See also
1947–48 NHL season

References

New York Rangers seasons
New York Rangers
New York Rangers
New York Rangers
New York Rangers
Madison Square Garden
1940s in Manhattan